William Howard Dabney (September 28, 1934 – February 15, 2012) was a colonel in the United States Marine Corps. He was awarded the Navy Cross for extraordinary heroism in the Vietnam War. He also served as the Commandant of Cadets at Virginia Military Institute (VMI) from 1989 to 1990.

Biography 
Dabney was born as William Wagner in  Saint John New Brunswick, Canada on September 28, 1934, to Victor William Wagner (1894–1972) and Mary Hennessey Wagner (1902–1990). His mother remarried Hugh Keane Dabney (1893-1972) on May 5, 1945, in Henrico Co., Virginia and his surname was changed to Dabney.   He was raised in Panama and Gloucester County, Virginia, graduating from Christchurch School in Middlesex County, Virginia in 1953. He attended Yale University 1953–54, then enlisted in the USMC, and later graduated from Virginia Military Institute in 1961 and was an initiate of the Beta Commission of Kappa Alpha Order. In that same year, Dabney married Virginia McCandlish Puller, daughter of Lieutenant General Lewis Burwell "Chesty" Puller in September 1961. Colonel Dabney is also a central character as then Captain and commanding officer on Hill 881 near Khe Sanh during the siege of Khe Sanh in the Historical Fiction novel titled "1968" by Kenton Michael.

U.S. Marine Corps
He enlisted in the U.S. Marine Corps (USMC) in 1954. He was discharged with the rank of sergeant and enlisted in the Marine Corps Reserve (USMCR) in 1957. He attended Virginia Military Institute (VMI), graduating in 1961. He was commissioned in the Marine Corps in 1960.
He was married to Virginia McCandlish Puller in September 1961. She was the daughter of the legendary Marine Corps general, Lewis Burwell "Chesty" Puller.

Vietnam
Dabney served two tours of duty in South Vietnam (RVN) during the Vietnam War. On his first tour from 1967 to 1968, he was in command of India Company, 3rd Battalion, 26th Marines, stationed on Hill 881 South during the Battle of Khe Sanh. Dabney was awarded the Silver Star for action on January 20, 1968, on Hill 881 South. In 2005, Dabney was awarded the Navy Cross for his actions on Hill 881 South from January 21 to April 14, 1968. He also received a Bronze Star Medal and a Republic of Vietnam Gallantry Cross for actions during that same time period. On his second tour from 1970 to 1971, he was a senior adviser for a Vietnamese Marine infantry battalion, Khe Sanh, South Vietnam. Dabney was awarded a second Bronze Star, two Navy and Marine Corps Commendation Medals, a Purple Heart Medal, and a second RVN Gallantry Cross.

Post-Vietnam
He received the Defense Meritorious Service Medal during his service as Chief of the Combat Operations Center, National Emergency Airborne Command Post, Offutt Air Force Base, Nebraska, 1980–1981.

He received the Legion of Merit while serving as Commanding Officer, Headquarters Battalion, Headquarters, Marine Corps, Henderson Hall, 1984–1987.

He also served as the Commandant of Cadets at Virginia Military Institute from 1989 to 1990 and was the Commanding Officer of VMI's NROTC Unit from 1987 to 1990. Dabney retired June 30, 1990.

Death
Dabney died February 15, 2012, at his home in Lexington, Virginia.

Decorations and awards 
Colonel Dabney's military awards include:

Navy Cross citation

The President of the United States of America takes pleasure in presenting the Navy Cross to Colonel [then Captain] William H. Dabney (MCSN: 0-80399), United States Marine Corps, for extraordinary heroism while serving as Commanding Officer of two heavily reinforced rifle companies of the Third Battalion, Twenty-Sixth Marines, THIRD Marine Division (Reinforced), Fleet Marine Force, in connection with operations against the enemy in the Republic of Vietnam from 21 January to 14 April 1968. During the entire period, Colonel Dabney's force stubbornly defended Hill 881S, a regional outpost vital to the defense of the Khe Sanh Combat Base. Following his bold spoiling attack on 20 January 1968, shattering a much larger North Vietnamese Army (NVA) force deploying to attack Hill 881S, Colonel Dabney's force was surrounded and cut off from all outside ground supply for the entire 77 day Siege of Khe Sanh. Enemy snipers, machine guns, artillery, and 120-millimeter mortars responded to any daylight movement on his position. In spite of deep entrenchments, his total casualties during the siege were close to 100 percent. Helicopters were his only source of resupply, and each such mission brought down a cauldron of fire on his landing zones. On numerous occasions Colonel Dabney raced into the landing zone under heavy hostile fire to direct debarkation of personnel and to carry wounded Marines to evacuation helicopters. The extreme difficulty of resupply resulted in conditions of hardship and deprivation seldom experienced by American forces. Nevertheless, Colonel Dabney's indomitable spirit was truly an inspiration to his troops. He organized his defenses with masterful skill and his preplanned fires shattered every enemy probe on his positions. He also devised an early warning system whereby NVA artillery and rocket firings from the west were immediately reported by lookouts to the Khe Sanh Combat Base, giving exposed personnel a few life saving seconds to take cover, saving countless lives, and facilitating the targeting of enemy firing positions. Colonel Dabney repeatedly set an incredible example of calm courage under fire, gallantly exposing himself at the center of every action without concern for his own safety. Colonel Dabney contributed decisively to ultimate victory in the Battle of Khe Sanh, and ranks among the most heroic stands of any American force in history. By his valiant combat leadership, exceptional bravery, and selfless devotion to duty, Colonel Dabney reflected great credit upon himself and upheld the highest traditions of the Marine Corps and the United States Naval Service.

Silver Star citation

The President of the United States of America takes pleasure in presenting the Silver Star to Captain William H. Dabney (MCSN: 0-80399), United States Marine Corps, for conspicuous gallantry and intrepidity in action while serving as Commanding Officer of Company I, Third Battalion, Twenty-Sixth Marines, THIRD Marine Division in connection with operations against the enemy in the Republic of Vietnam. On 20 January 1968, Captain Dabney deployed his unit into two elements and advanced north on two parallel ridge lines from Hill 881 South. After advancing approximately 1,000 meters, his unit came under fire from an estimated North Vietnamese Army battalion entrenched in fortified positions. Reacting instantly, he called in heavy supporting arms fire and directed accurate 106-mm. recoilless rifle fire which destroyed two hostile emplacements. When one of his platoons became pinned down by the intense enemy fire after seizing its objective, he aggressively advanced across 500 meters of open terrain with the remainder of his unit to relieve the beleaguered Marines. Completely disregarding his own safety, he repeatedly exposed himself to the enemy fire in order to pinpoint North Vietnamese automatic weapons positions. His bold initiative was instrumental in the destruction of a hostile .50 caliber machine gun which had shot down a medical evacuation aircraft. When Captain Dabney coordinated all his forces and evacuated all casualties, he ordered his men to withdraw and remained behind to provide covering fire until his men had reached the base of the hill. Only then did he leave the area to rejoin his unit. As a result of his aggressive actions, his company accounted for 103 North Vietnamese confirmed killed. By his courage inspiring leadership and selfless devotion to duty at great personal risk, Captain Dabney upheld the highest traditions of the Marine Corps and of the United States Naval Service.

See also 
List of Navy Cross recipients for the Vietnam War

References

External links 
Navy Cross Citation and Silver Star synopsis
HMM-364.org – Military Biography
Legacy.com – Obituary

Military.com – Leatherneck: Hill 881 South by R. R. Keene
VMI, TAPS – Two Former Commandants Pass This Week

1934 births
2012 deaths
People from Gloucester County, Virginia
People from Saint John, New Brunswick
Recipients of the Legion of Merit
Recipients of the Navy Cross (United States)
Recipients of the Silver Star
United States Marine Corps colonels
United States Marines
Virginia Military Institute alumni
Yale University alumni
United States Marine Corps personnel of the Vietnam War
United States Marine Corps reservists
People from Lexington, Virginia